Campochiaro is a comune (municipality) in the Province of Campobasso in the Italian region Molise, located about  southwest of Campobasso.

Campochiaro borders the following municipalities: Castello del Matese, Colle d'Anchise, Guardiaregia, Piedimonte Matese, San Gregorio Matese, San Polo Matese, Vinchiaturo.

References

Cities and towns in Molise